Govza is a village in Foča, Bosnia and Herzegovina.

References

Villages in Republika Srpska
Populated places in Foča